Richard Krajicek was the defending champion but lost in the second round to Cédric Pioline.

Goran Ivanišević won in the final 6–4, 3–6, 6–3 against Yevgeny Kafelnikov.

Seeds
A champion seed is indicated in bold text while text in italics indicates the round in which that seed was eliminated.

  Pete Sampras (quarterfinals)
  Goran Ivanišević (champion)
  Yevgeny Kafelnikov (final)
  Marc Rosset (quarterfinals)
  Arnaud Boetsch (second round)
  Richard Krajicek (second round)
  Jan Siemerink (first round)
  Bohdan Ulihrach (first round)

Draw

External links
 1996 ABN AMRO World Tennis Tournament draw

1996 ABN AMRO World Tennis Tournament
1996 ATP Tour